Stanley Kubrick (1928–1999) was an American film director who did most of his work as an expatriate in the United Kingdom.

Kubrick may also refer to:

Astronomy
 10221 Kubrick, an asteroid
 Kubrick Mons, a mountain peak on Pluto's moon Charon

People
 Vivian Kubrick (born 1960), filmmaker and composer, daughter of Stanley Kubrick
 Christiane Kubrick (born 1932), artist and performer, wife of Stanley Kubrick

Other uses
 Kubrick (toy), a Japanese toy
 Kubrick the Dog, a photography book by Sean Ellis
 Kubrick (album), a 2015 album by Soulsavers